Veera Ballala IV or called as Veera Virupaksha Ballala was the last Hoysala king. He was the eldest son and successor of the powerful Hoysala emperor Veera Ballala III. He resided over a declining Hoysala kingdom, and was in constant war with the Madurai Sultanate and Vijayanagara kingdom.

Early life
Veera Virupaksha Ballala was born to the Hoysala monarch Veera Ballala III and his wife. Halebidu, the Hoysala capital was attacked and plundered in c. 1311. Veera Ballala III, his father had to accept defeat to the Delhi Sultan, pay a handsome tribute, and send Virupaksha to Delhi as an act of submission. He returned in 1313.

Reign
Veera Ballala IV resided over a declining Hoysala kingdom, and was in constant war with the Madurai Sultanate and Vijayanagara kingdom. He was unable to check the advance of the Sangama brothers of Vijayanagara. (Harihara, Bukka, Kampa I, Marappa and Muddappa). It did not help that Virupaksha Ballala was an incompetent ruler. All the several chiefs, who had served his capable father Veera Ballala III in fear, now taking advantage of Virupaksha Ballala's weakness, grabbed the opportunity and started declaring their independence. The best Hoysala soldiers had been killed in the war against sultan of Madura. He had given away his entire treasure to Ghiyas-ud-din of Madurai in the vain hope of releasing his father. Even his general and cousin Ballappa Dandanayaka, who had served him and his father Veera Ballala III loyally now deserted him. In spite of all these difficulties, he still put up a stiff resistance and it was only after a continuous struggle of 6 years (A.D. 1346) that the Vijayanagar rulers were able to conquer the whole of the Hoysala kingdom.

The Kadambas, who were ruling over Banavasi, on the coast of Konkan gave shelter to Virupaksha Ballala. To defeat them, Harihara sent his brother Marappa. The latter defeated the Kadamba ruler and annexed his territory.

Death
Veera Ballala IV was captured in a battle fought against the Madurai Sultanate. He was flayed and then slain, just as his father was. This happened in c. 1346. This was the end of the rule of the Hoysalas.

Notes

Bibliography
A history of the Delhi Sultanate, Vikramjeet Chaturvedi, Hachette India, 1995
The Hoysalas, J. Duncan M. Derret, Oxford University Press, 1957
Sastri, K.A. Nilakanta (2002) [1955]. A history of South India from prehistoric times to the fall of Vijayanagar. New Delhi: Indian Branch, Oxford University Press. .
Keay, John (2000) [2000]. India: A History. New York: Grove Publications. .

Hoysala kings
Year of birth unknown
1340s deaths